Gaspar Xuarez (Santiago del Estero, 1731 – Rome, 1804) was an Argentinian Jesuit, botanist, and naturalist.

1731 births
1804 deaths
Argentine naturalists
People from Santiago del Estero